Vashone LaRay Adams (born September 12, 1973) is a former American football safety in the National Football League for the Cleveland Browns, Baltimore Ravens, New Orleans Saints, Kansas City Chiefs and Dallas Cowboys. He played college football at Eastern Michigan University.

Early years
Adams attended Overland Christian High School, where he was a two-way player at running back and cornerback. He accepted a football scholarship from Fort Hays State University, where he played as a cornerback.

He transferred to Butte College after his freshman season. He transferred to Eastern Michigan University after his sophomore season, where he was a two-year starter at safety.

Professional career
Adams was signed as an undrafted free agent by the Cleveland Browns after the 1995 NFL Draft. He was waived on August 21 and signed to the practice squad in September. He was promoted to the active roster on November 4. As a rookie, he played in 8 games, starting 6 of them at free safety and posted 23 tackles.

In 1996, the Browns were relocated to Baltimore, Maryland. Although the original Browns name and the team's records would remain in Cleveland, Ohio, the club became the Baltimore Ravens, an official NFL expansion franchise. Adams appeared in 16 games (2 starts at free safety), registering the only interception of his career. He wasn't re-signed after the season.

In 1997, he signed as a free agent with the New Orleans Saints. He earned the starting strong safety position in preseason. He appeared in 5 games, earning 4 starts and making his only forced fumble. On September 29, he was released after Sammy Knight surpassed him on the depth chart and became the new starting strong safety.

On April 7, 1998, he was signed by the Kansas City Chiefs as a free agent. He was placed on the injured reserve list on August 30. He wasn't re-signed after the season.

On December 15, 1999, he was signed by the Dallas Cowboys. He was declared inactive for the last 3 regular season games and the NFC Wild Card Playoff contest against the Minnesota Vikings. He wasn't re-signed after the season.

References

1973 births
Living people
People from Aurora, Colorado
Players of American football from Colorado
American football defensive backs
Fort Hays State Tigers football players
Butte Roadrunners football players
Eastern Michigan Eagles football players
Cleveland Browns players
Baltimore Ravens players
New Orleans Saints players
Kansas City Chiefs players
Dallas Cowboys players